This is a list of submissions to the 55th Academy Awards for Best Foreign Language Film. The Academy Award for Best Foreign Language Film was created in 1956 by the Academy of Motion Picture Arts and Sciences to honour non-English-speaking films produced outside the United States. The award is handed out annually, and is accepted by the winning film's director, although it is considered an award for the submitting country as a whole. Countries are invited by the Academy to submit their best films for competition according to strict rules, with only one film being accepted from each country.

For the 55th Academy Awards, twenty-five films were submitted in the category Academy Award for Best Foreign Language Film. Nicaragua submitted a film for the first time. The bolded titles were the five nominated films, which came from France, Nicaragua, Sweden, the USSR and the eventual winner, Begin the Beguine, from Spain.

Submissions

Notes

  Switzerland was allowed to submit their Palm d'Or-winning entry Yol, a film in Turkish by a pair of Turkish directors. The film had been banned for political content at home, and was smuggled into Switzerland and edited in Paris.

References

55